Bella Vista is a district and city in the Itapúa Department of Paraguay.

References 

Districts of Itapúa Department